Göllü is a lava dome located in central Turkey. The volcano has produced rhyolite, dacite and basalt. The lavas have been dated at 1.33 to 0.84 million years by fission track dating of obsidian. The dome lies above the Tertiary Derinkuyu caldera.

See also
 List of volcanoes in Turkey

References 

Mountains of Turkey
Volcanoes of Turkey
Pleistocene lava domes
Landforms of Niğde Province